Gladiators 7 is a 1962 film directed by Pedro Lazaga. The film has several elements from Akira Kurosawa's film The Seven Samurai.

Plot
A Greek gladiator seeks revenge for the murder of his father and finds his lover captured by an evil tyrant.

Cast
Richard Harrison as Darius
Loredana Nusciak as Aglaia
Livio Lorenzon as Panurgus
Gérard Tichy as Hiarba
Edoardo Toniolo as Milon
José Marco as Xeno
Barta Barri as Flaccus
Nazzareno Zamperla as Vargas (credited as Tony Zamperla) 
Franca Badeschi as Licia
Enrique Ávila as Livius
Antonio Molino Rojo as Macrobius
Antonio Rubio as Mados
Emilia Wolkowicz as Ismere

Production
The film was partially shot on some of the locations where El Cid was filmed. Parts of the film were shot in Spain.

Release
Gladiators 7 was released theatrically in Italy on 11 October 1962 with a 105 minute running time and in the United States on 6 May 1964 with a 92 minute running time.

Reception
In contemporary reviews, "Tube." of Variety found the film to have a cliche screenplay with "stiff acting" and "mechanical dubbing". "Tube." noted that among the action sequences, the best involved a bout between a bull and a bare-handed gladiator but that the film was "erratic in tempo and dramatically heavyhanded." A review in the Monthly Film Bulletin stated that "the customary ingredients of colour, passion, and swordplay, here lavishly applied, add up to a lighthearted and lusty swashbuckling film."

References

Footnotes

Sources

External links
 

Italian drama films
Spanish drama films
Films shot in Spain
Films with screenplays by Giovanni Grimaldi
Films about gladiatorial combat
1960s Spanish films
1960s Italian films